Michèle Rohrbach  (born 28 December 1974) is a Swiss freestyle skier. She competed at the 1998 Winter Olympics in Nagano, where she placed eleventh in women's aerials.

References

External links 
 

1974 births
Living people
Swiss female freestyle skiers
Olympic freestyle skiers of Switzerland
Freestyle skiers at the 1998 Winter Olympics
20th-century Swiss women
21st-century Swiss women